Weloganite is a rare carbonate mineral with formula:   It was discovered by Canadian government mineralogist Ann P. Sabina in 1967 and named for Canadian geologist Sir William Edmond Logan (1798–1875). It was first discovered in Francon Quarry, Montreal, Quebec, Canada and has only been reported from a few localities worldwide.

Properties

It is usually white, lemon yellow, or amber in color, and can be translucent. It crystallizes in the triclinic system and shows pseudo-hexagonal crystal forms due to twinning.  The width of the crystals typically undulates down the length, forming crystals that widen in the middle or flare out at the end.  Crystals are affected by light and can develop a white alteration coating over time.  Weloganite is triboluminescent, producing blue light.

Occurrence

It occurs in an igneous carbonatite sill in Montreal, Quebec, Canada in the Francon Quarry where it was first discovered. It also occurs in the Mont Saint-Hilaire district.  Associated minerals include strontianite, dawsonite and calcite. It has also been reported from the Pilansberg Complex of the western Bushveld Igneous Complex in South Africa.

See also

List of minerals
List of minerals named after people

References

External links
Mineral Galleries

Sodium minerals
Strontium minerals
Calcium minerals
Zirconium minerals
Carbonate minerals
Triclinic minerals
Luminescent minerals
Minerals in space group 1